Charles Lamont "Charlie" Jenkins (born January 7, 1934) is a former American athlete, winner of two gold medals at the 1956 Summer Olympics.

Coached by Jumbo Elliott, Jenkins won in the 1955 National AAU title in 440 yd (402 m) but at the 1956 Olympics all eyes were on Jenkins' U.S. teammate, Lou Jones, who held the world record. Jones had won the U.S. Trials while Jenkins had placed a distant third. At Melbourne, Jenkins barely made it to the 400 m Olympic final, finishing third in both his first and second-round heats. In the final, however, a strong finish earned him the gold medal. A few days later he won a second gold medal when the U.S. took the 4 x 400 m relay.

Jenkins also competed indoors, winning the AAU 600 yd (549 m) title in 1955, 1957 and 1958. In 1956, he set a world indoor best for 500 yd (457 m). When Elliott died in 1981, Jenkins succeeded him as Villanova coach. One of his charges was his son, Chip, who placed third at the 1986 NCAA indoor championships. Like his father, Chip also became an Olympic gold medalist, running as a reserve on the U.S. 4×400 m relay team at the 1992 Summer Olympics making it the first time in history that a father and a son won gold medals in the same event.

In December 1956 Jenkins married Phyllis Randolph. In the 1970s he worked for the U.S. Office of Education.

References

External links 

 
 
 

1934 births
Living people
American male sprinters
Olympic gold medalists for the United States in track and field
Athletes (track and field) at the 1956 Summer Olympics
Track and field athletes from New York City
Villanova University alumni
Medalists at the 1956 Summer Olympics